Dospat is a town in the very south of Bulgaria, part of Smolyan Province, situated in the Rhodope Mountains, close to Dospat Dam. It is the administrative centre of the homonymous Dospat Municipality. As of December 2010, the town has a population of 2,425 inhabitants who are mainly Bulgarian Muslims.

The town was probably founded by Despot Alexius Slav in the 12th or 13th century, from whose title (despot) its name is very likely derived.
Dospat Dam is the highest dam in Bulgaria by altitude and, with its 22 km2 of water area, the second largest in capacity. It is fed by the River Dospat. At the bottom of the lake is a former German military airport from the Second World War.

Honour
Dospat Peak on Livingston Island in the South Shetland Islands, Antarctica is named after Dospat.

References

External links 
 Official website of Dospat Municipality

Towns in Bulgaria
Cities and towns in the Rhodopes
Populated places in Smolyan Province
Chech